Michelle Molatlou (1973 – 19 December 2017), was a South African actress, television presenter and Former Miss Black South Africa. She is best known for the roles in the television serials such as; In the Name of Love, Mokgonyana Matswale and Generations.

Personal life
She had one brother, Kgosi Monye.

She was married to businessman Malope Mojapelo from 2006 to 2014. She was a mother of two sons.

She died on 19 December 2017 at the age of 44 while receiving treatment for cervical cancer at the National Hospital in Bloemfontein.

Career
In 1993, she won the Miss Black South Africa pageant. With that, she became the last person to win the title before the pageant was discontinued since then. After the pageant, she joined with SABC2 as a television presenter to host the magazine show Mamepe. Meanwhile, she joined with television serials such as; Kgalelo Pelo, In the Name of Love, and Mokgonyana Matswale. However, her most notable television acting came through the SABC1 soap opera Generations: The Legacy in 2016. In 2017, she worked as the presenter of Mzansi Magic program Lokshin Bioscope movies.

In 2000, she made the film debut with direct-to-video Die Wüstenrose where she played the role of "Luna". Then she made appearances in many Direct-to-video films such as; Eine Liebe in Afrika, Folge deinem Herzen, Für immer Afrika and Afrika im Herzen.

Filmography

References

External links
 IMDb

1973 births
2017 deaths
South African film actresses
South African television presenters
South African television actresses
Deaths from cervical cancer
Deaths from cancer in South Africa